The 2017 European Junior Badminton Championships were held at the Centre Sportif Regional d'Alsace in Mulhouse, France, between 7 April - 16 April 2017.

Medalists

Medal table

References

European Junior Badminton Championships
European Junior Badminton Championships
European Junior Badminton Championships
European Junior Badminton Championships
International sports competitions hosted by France